Ole Petter Söderberg (born 20 July 1990) is a retired Swedish footballer who played as a goalkeeper, and current goalkeeper coach of Ettan club GAIS.

Club career

BK Häcken
Söderberg began his career at Swedish club BK Häcken. In 2007, he signed a contract with the club stretching to 2010. As a teen, he played five games in the Swedish national under-19s team.

Newcastle United
Söderberg joined English Premier League side Newcastle United on a four-and-a-half-year contract in January 2008. He broke his wrist in September 2008, and he had knee surgery in 2009 after having problems with a meniscus.

When Steve Harper, Newcastle's first choice goalkeeper, sustained an injury in September 2010, Söderberg became the backup goalkeeper of the first team and sat on the bench for 19 games.

Loan spells
In October 2011, Söderberg went on a one-month loan to Darlington, where he made six appearances after which he went on a one-month loan to Chesterfield. He made his Football League debut for Chesterfield on 5 November 2011 in a 2–2 draw with Yeovil Town. He then played against Oldham in which many fans have dubbed the most calamitous piece of goalkeeping ever by jumping over the striker and then trying to claim the ball instead of claiming the ball first time. He then made his Football League Trophy début in a 4–3 win against Tranmere Rovers on 9 November 2011 and his FA Cup debut three days later in a 3–1 defeat against Torquay United.

Molde FK
On 30 March 2012, Söderberg confirmed on his Twitter account that he had joined Norwegian outfit Molde FK. On 30 June 2012, he made his debut in Tippeligaen in a 3–1 win against Odd. He played seven games in the league in his first season for the club who won the 2012 Tippeligaen. In 2013, Söderberg won the Norwegian Cup with Molde.

Kalmar FF
On 3 January 2014, Kalmar FF confirmed on their official website that Ole has joined the Swedish team. The contract is valid until 2017. In October 2016, Söderberg extended his contract with Kalmar. His new contract expired at the end of the 2018 season.

AFC Eskilstuna
For the 2019 season Söderberg signed with AFC Eskilstuna.

GAIS
After spells at Kalmar FF and IFK Göteborg, Söderberg joined GAIS' coaching staff, with a focus on helping the goalkeepers. Beside that, he would also be a backup if either goaltender got injured or suspended.

Personal life 
Söderberg was born in Norrköping, Sweden in 1990. His brother Tom Söderberg (born 1987) is a retired professional footballer that played as a defender.

Honours
Molde FK
 Tippeligaen: 2012
 Norwegian Cup: 2013

References

External links
 
 
 

1990 births
Living people
Association football goalkeepers
Swedish footballers
Newcastle United F.C. players
Darlington F.C. players
Chesterfield F.C. players
Molde FK players
BK Häcken players
Hisingsbacka FC players
Kalmar FF players
AFC Eskilstuna players
IFK Göteborg players
National League (English football) players
English Football League players
Eliteserien players
Allsvenskan players
Swedish expatriate footballers
Expatriate footballers in England
Expatriate footballers in Norway
Swedish expatriate sportspeople in England
Swedish expatriate sportspeople in Norway
Sweden youth international footballers
Sweden under-21 international footballers
Sportspeople from Norrköping
Footballers from Östergötland County